Langen may refer to:

Places 
Germany
 Langen, Cuxhaven, in the district of Cuxhaven, Lower Saxony
 Langen, Emsland, part of the Samtgemeinde Lengerich, in the Emsland district, Lower Saxony
 , a village in the municipality of Fehrbellin, Brandenburg
 Langen, Hesse, in the district of Offenbach, Hesse
 Langen Brütz, a municipality in the district of Parchim, in Mecklenburg-Vorpommern
 Langen Jarchow, a municipality in the district of Parchim, in Mecklenburg-Vorpommern

Austria
 Langen am Arlberg, part of Klösterle, in Vorarlberg
 Langen bei Bregenz, in Vorarlberg

Other uses 
 Langen (surname)